Yang Zhuoxin (10 October 1890 – 10 June 1963) was a Chinese educator and mathematician who served as president of Hunan University from August 1930 to March 1931.

Biography
Yang was born and raised in Xinhua County, Hunan. He attended Zijiang School. He graduated from Hunan High College (now Hunan University) in 1908. He was sent abroad to study at the expense of the government in 1903. He studied at Harvard University and the University of Wisconsin–Madison. He received his master's degree from the University of Illinois and doctor's degree from Syracuse University. He then studied at Cambridge University (1920), the University of London (1920), the University of Paris (1922), and the Humboldt University of Berlin (1923).

He returned China in 1924 and that year became professor of mathematics at Hunan University. In the spring of 1927 he was appointed academic director of Hunan University. After this office was terminated in August 1930, he became president of Hunan University, serving until March 1931.

On June 10, 1963, he died of stomach cancer in Changsha, Hunan.

References

1890 births
People from Loudi
1963 deaths
Hunan University alumni
Presidents of Hunan University
Academic staff of Hunan University
Harvard University alumni
University of Wisconsin–Madison alumni
University of Illinois alumni
Syracuse University alumni
Mathematicians from Hunan
Educators from Hunan